The 2014 Ju-Jitsu World Championship were the 12th edition of the Ju-Jitsu World Championships, and were held in Paris, France from November 28 to November 30, 2014.

Schedule 
28.11.2014 – Men's and Women's Fighting System, Men's and Women's Jiu-Jitsu (ne-waza), Men's Duo System – Classic
29.11.2014 – Men's and Women's Fighting System, Men's and Women's Jiu-Jitsu (ne-waza), Women's Duo System – Classic
30.11.2014 – Men's Jiu-Jitsu (ne-waza), Mixed Duo System – Classic, Team event

European Ju-Jitsu

Fighting System

Men's events

Women's events

Duo System

Duo Classic events

Brazilian Jiu-Jitsu

Men's events

Women's events

Team event

Links

References

External links
Online results
Official results (PDF)
Mixed team event results (PDF)

 
2014 in French sport